Donald Watt (born 23 July 1953) was a Scottish footballer who played for Celtic, Dumbarton and  East Stirlingshire.

References

1953 births
Scottish footballers
Dumbarton F.C. players
East Stirlingshire F.C. players
Scottish Football League players
Living people
Place of birth missing (living people)
Glasgow United F.C. players
Celtic F.C. players

Association football fullbacks